OIRA is an acronym that may stand for:

 Office of Information and Regulatory Affairs in the United States Office of Management and Budget
 Official Irish Republican Army
 Oira, a Japanese pronoun